Doa translucida is a moth in the Doidae family. It was described by Paul Dognin in 1910. It is found in Colombia.

References

Moths described in 1910
Doidae